Bamutia is one of the 60 Legislative Assembly constituencies of Tripura state in India. It is part of West Tripura district and is reserved for candidates belonging to the Scheduled Castes. It is also part of Tripura West (Lok Sabha constituency).

Members of Legislative Assembly 
 1972: Prafulla Kumar Das, Indian National Congress
 1977: Haricharan Sarkar, Communist Party of India (Marxist)
 1983: Haricharan Sarkar, Communist Party of India (Marxist)
 1988: Prakash Chandra Das, Indian National Congress
 1993: Haricharan Sarkar, Communist Party of India (Marxist)
 1998: Prakash Chandra Das, Indian National Congress
 2003: Prakash Chandra Das, Indian National Congress
 2008: Haricharan Sarkar, Communist Party of India (Marxist)
 2013: Haricharan Sarkar, Communist Party of India (Marxist)

Election results

2018 election

2013

See also
List of constituencies of the Tripura Legislative Assembly
West Tripura district

References

West Tripura district
Assembly constituencies of Tripura